Harford Secondary School for Girls is a secondary school for girls in Moyamba, Sierra Leone.

History
The roots of the school lie in the Mary Sowers School for Girls, founded by United Brethren in Christ (UBC) missionaries at Rotifunk. The school was closed during the Hut Tax War of 1898, but was reopened as the Moyamba Girls School. In 1903 the school was merged with the UBC's girls' boarding school at Shenge, and buildings were completed and occupied at Rotifunk in 1908. Julius Gulama taught at the school before he became a paramount chief in 1928. In 1921 the school was renamed the Lilian Harford School for Girls, after the American missionary Lillian Resler Keister Harford, and in 1944 the school became a secondary school.

The American missionary Esther L. Megill taught biology at Harford for a year in 1957, and later published her reminiscences of the school. From 1961 to 1965 William Henry Fitzjohn and his wife Alice served as Principal and Vice-Principal of Harford School. John K. Yambasu, later Bishop, was a senior teacher and school chaplain from 1982 to 1990. 

During the Sierra Leone Civil War the school's buildings were badly damaged, and the school has needed to rebuild itself since then.

Alumni
 Lucy Sharon-Mae Anthony, first woman bishop in Sierra Leone.
 Ella Koblo Gulama (1921-2006), Sierra Leone's first female Member of Parliament
 Umu Hawa Tejan-Jalloh (born 1949), Chief Justice of Sierra Leone

External links
 Harford ex-pupils association

References

1900 establishments in the British Empire
Educational institutions established in 1900
Secondary schools in Sierra Leone
Girls' schools in Sierra Leone